Barbie Fashion Show: An Eye for Style is a strategy video game by Thai studio Cyber Planet Interactive based on the Barbie franchise. The game is the sequel to the PC game Barbie Fashion Show. In this game, players take the role of a fashion assistant to Barbie, voiced by Kelly Sheridan and her best friend, Teresa, voiced by Catherine 'Cat' Main. The game also allows players to design clothes to be worn by the models ingame.

Reception
In their review, jeuxvideo gave the game 10/20 criticising its simplistic gameplay and graphics as well as the limited content which they claimed would not take more than an hour to beat. They did however think it would appeal to its target audience of very young girls more convincingly  than some other offerings.

References

External links

2008 video games
Fashion Show: An Eye for Style
Nintendo DS games
Windows games
Activision games
Sega video games
Video games developed in Thailand
Single-player video games